Genre film may refer to:

 A film conforming to a well-defined film genre
 Genre Films, aka Kinberg Genre, a television and film production company
 Genre (1996 film), a live-action/animated short by Don Hertzfeldt

See also
 Genre, the generic term referring to all forms of art and entertainment
 B movie, a generic film with minimal artistic ambitions